The Pincus Building, also known as the Zadek Building, is a historic Queen Anne-style commercial building in Mobile, Alabama, United States.  The four-story brick masonry structure was designed by local architect Rudolph Benz and completed in 1891.  It first housed the Zadek Jewelry Company.  The original design included a round tower with a spire on the outside corner of the building; this was removed by the 1940s. Additionally, the architectural details of the first floor exterior have been simplified.  It was placed on the National Register of Historic Places on December 12, 1976.

References

National Register of Historic Places in Mobile, Alabama
Commercial buildings completed in 1891
Queen Anne architecture in Alabama
Commercial buildings on the National Register of Historic Places in Alabama